Kineta railway station is a train station in Kineta, West Attica, Greece. It is located just north of the town, adjacent to the A8 motorway. It was opened on 27 September 2005 as part of the extension of the Athens Airport–Patras railway to Corinth. It is the westernmost railway station in Attica.

History
The station was opened on 27 September 2005 as part of the extension of the Athens Airport–Patras railway to Corinth, as part of Line 2 of the Athens Suburban Railway began serving the station. built to a simmer layout and design to Nea Peramos, the station was further updated its current form dates to 2007. In 2009, with the Greek debt crisis unfolding OSE's Management was forced to reduce services across the network. Timetables were cutback and routes closed, as the government-run entity attempted to reduce overheads. In 2017 OSE's passenger transport sector was privatised as TrainOSE, currently a wholly-owned subsidiary of Ferrovie dello Stato Italiane infrastructure, including stations, remained under the control of OSE. In July 2022, the station began being served by Hellenic Train, the rebranded TranOSE.

Facilities
The raised level station is assessed via stairs or lifts. It has two Side platforms, with station buildings located on platform 1 (the eastbound platform), with access to the platform level via stairs or lifts from a subway. The Station buildings are equipped with a staffed booking office, ticket-purchasing facilities & toilets at the entrance to the station. At platform level, there are sheltered seating, an air-conditioned indoor passenger shelter and Dot-matrix display departure and arrival screens and timetable poster boards on both platforms. Currently (2021), there is a regional bus stop
(with hourly connections to Kiato and Piraeus), a large "park & ride" car park and taxi rank all located at the station forecourt.

Services

Since 15 May 2022, the following weekday services call at this station:

Station layout

See also
Greek railway stations
Hellenic Railways Organization
Hellenic Train
Proastiakos

References

External links
 Kineta railway station - National Railway Network Greek Travel Pages

Megara
Railway stations in Attica
Transport in West Attica
Railway stations opened in 2005